Gertrude Selby was an American actress who was active in Hollywood in the silent era. She appeared in dozens of films between 1914 and 1920, mostly short comedies.

Biography 
Gertrude was born in Philadelphia to William Selby and Olga Hansen, and she was educated in New York City. She began her career as a vaudevillian before breaking into the nascent motion picture industry around 1914, working frequently on L-KO comedies.

In 1919, at age 24, she married wealthy Chicago socialite Townsend Netcher in Beverly Hills after a three-week courtship, against the wishes of Necher's family. The couple divorced in the late 1920s, with Selby filing on the grounds of cruelty. Netcher later married actress Constance Talmadge.

Selby appears to have retired from acting around the time she married Netcher, and spent several years post-divorce living in Spain with her mother and sister. The three were evacuated from their apartment in Barcelona at the start of the Spanish Civil War. Selby spent time post-Spain in a penthouse in Paris before returning to the United States in the early 1940s at the outbreak of World War II. She does not appear to have ever remarried.

Select filmography 

 Easy to Make Money (1919)
 Kidder & Ko (1918)
 Twenty-One (1918)
 The Double Room Mystery (1917)
 A Child of Mystery (1916)
 The Sign of the Poppy (1916)

References 

American film actresses
1894 births
1975 deaths
Actresses from Pennsylvania
Actresses from Philadelphia
People from Philadelphia